The  is given to the player deemed to have the most impact on his team's performance in the Japan Series, which is the final round of the Nippon Professional Baseball (NPB) postseason. The award was first presented in 1950.

The series follows a best-of-seven playoff format and occurs after the two-stage Climax Series. It is played by the winners of the Central League Stage 2 series and the Pacific League Stage 2 series.

Kaoru Betto won the inaugural award in 1950 with the Mainichi Orions. Depending upon definitions, the first non-Japanese to win the award was either Andy Miyamoto in 1961 or Joe Stanka in 1964. Fifteen Japan Series MVPs were inducted into the Japanese Baseball Hall of Fame; Osamu Higashio (1982) is the only Hall of Famer to have won the Japan Series MVP between 1981 and 2000. Higashio is also the first and only pitcher to appear solely as a reliever to win the Japan Series MVP. Eight of the ten Japan Series MVPs who have won the award since 2000 are still active in professional baseball—Atsuya Furuta and Takashi Ishii are the Japan Series MVPs from that period who are inactive. Hideki Matsui and Norihiro Nakamura are they only two Japan Series MVPs to play in Major League Baseball (MLB). While Nakamura's MLB career lasted less than one season, Matsui's lasted seven seasons. He became the only player to be named both a Japan Series and a World Series MVP after winning the latter award in 2009. The reigning Japan Series MVP is Yuhei Nakamura of the Tokyo Yakult Swallows.

Sixteen of the 60 Japan Series MVPs have also won the NPB MVP or the Eiji Sawamura Award in the same season. Shigeru Sugishita (1954), Tsuneo Horiuchi (1972) and Takehiro Ishii (1992) are the only players to have won all three awards in the same season. Two players won the Eiji Sawamura Award and the Japan Series MVP in the same season: Takehiko Bessho (1955) and Takashi Nishimoto (1981). Ten players have won the Japan Series MVP in the same season in which they won the NPB MVP: Betto (1950), Bessho (1952), Kazuhisa Inao (1958), Tadashi Sugiura (1959), Shigeo Nagashima (1963), Stanka (1964), Hisashi Yamada (1977), Randy Bass (1985), Tom O'Malley (1995), Furuta (1997) and Matsui (2000).

Five players have won the award multiple times. Nagashima has won the most Japan Series MVP awards with four wins (1963, 1965, 1969–1970). The remaining four players all won the award twice: Bessho (1952, 1955), Horiuchi (1972–1973), Kimiyasu Kudoh (1986–1987), Koji Akiyama (1991–1999) and Furuta (1997, 2001); Akiyama is the only player to have won the award with different teams. There has been one occasion on which multiple winners were awarded in the same Japan Series: Masayuki Dobashi and Masayuki Tanemo in 1962.

Pitchers have been named Series MVP 21 times, 13 of which appeared in both starting and relief roles in the Series.

Winners

See also
Korean Series Most Valuable Player Award
World Series Most Valuable Player Award

References

Awards established in 1950
Nippon Professional Baseball trophies and awards
Baseball most valuable player awards
Most valuable player awards
1950 establishments in Japan